Anne-Marie Caminade is a French chemist who is Director of Research Exceptional Class at the French National Centre for Scientific Research. Her research considers dendrimers and heterochemistry. She was awarded the 2021 Société chimique de France Achille le Bel Grand Prize.

Early life and education 
Caminade was a doctoral researcher at Toulouse III - Paul Sabatier University. She investigated the oxidation of unsaturated bonds, including the carbon – carbon double bond (C = C), C = P and P = P. Her research considered the stabilisation of low coordinate phosphorus. She moved to Saarland University as a postdoctoral fellow in the laboratory of Michael Veith.

Research and career 
Caminade's research involves the chemistry of phosphorus. In particular, she is interested in hydrides, macrocells, cryptants and hyperbranched polymers. She has shown that the biological properties of dendrimers are influenced by their internal structures. By incorporating phosphorus into functionalised dendrimers (where phosphorus atoms are included at every branching point) and manipulating the internal structure, Caminade has shown them to be useful for anti-inflammatory medications and anti-cancer treatments.

In 2006 Caminade was appointed leader of the French National Centre for Scientific Research “Molecular and supramolecular heterochemistry” team.

Awards and honours 
 1988 Alexander von Humboldt Foundation Fellow
 1989 French National Centre for Scientific Research Bronze medal 
 2006 Société chimique de France Organic Chemistry Award
 2011 Appointed to the advisory board of the Chemical Society Reviews
 2021 Société chimique de France Achille le Bel Grand Prize

Caminade was awarded the Société chimique de France Achille le Bel Grand Prize for her contributions to dendrimers and the application of dendrimers in catalysis.

Selected publications

Books

References 

French women chemists
Living people
Year of birth missing (living people)
Paul Sabatier University alumni
Research directors of the French National Centre for Scientific Research